Ottawa High School may refer to:
Ottawa Township High School, a high school in Ottawa, Illinois
Ottawa Senior High School, a high school in Ottawa, Kansas